Yakhi Waterfall or Abshar Yakhi, is the waterfall in Amol, Iran, and is located near the southern part of Mount Damavand.

The height of Yakhi waterfall is about 8 to 12 meters in height. and it is located at 5100 meters of elevation. The waterfall is completely frozen throughout the year.

The meaning of its name in local language is the icy waterfall.

About the formation:  in the warmest moths of the year (July / Aug) only at noon, a very small portion of the waterfall's surface melts only  for some hours and then  freezes again. This melting process that occurs only in some hours of July and August has formed the whole  waterfall.
In the spring of 2022, due to the warming of the weather, a very strong wind caused this waterfall to fall, now we have to wait for the formation of this waterfall again.

References

Waterfalls of Iran
Tourist attractions in Amol
Tourist attractions in Mazandaran Province